Pamela Harris (born 1940) is a Canadian/American photographer.

Early life
Born in Erie, Pennsylvania, Harris grew up in Pennsylvania, New Jersey, Montana and California. She studied English literature at Pomona College, receiving a BA degree in 1962.  She moved to Cambridge, Massachusetts to teach, where she became interested in photography. Harris immigrated to Canada in 1967 and lives in Toronto.

Work
A self-taught photographer working primarily in black-and-white, Harris has focused on people in their environments, documenting a variety of communities--Newfoundland fishing villages, a community in Nunavut, her own extended family, the United Farmworkers Union, nannies, breast-cancer survivors and activist women across Canada.  In 1972 and 1973 she photographed in Spence Bay, N.W.T. (now Taloyoak, Nunavut), work published as Another Way of Being. She also built a community darkroom  in Taloyoak and taught darkroom skills to Inuit craftswomen who used it to document and promote their work. From 1985 to 1989 Harris photographed the grass-roots women's movement across Canada, pairing her portraits with text by the women portrayed.  Faces of Feminism was widely exhibited across Canada and was published by 2nd Story Press in 1992. Her work is included in the collections of the Art Gallery of Ontario and the National Gallery of Canada.

Further reading
 Harris, Pamela. Another Way of Being: Photographs of Spence Bay N.W.T. Toronto: Impressions, 1976.
 Harris, Pamela. Faces of Feminism: Portraits of women across Canada. Toronto: Second Story Press, 1992.
 Harris, Pamela. Hot, Cold, Shy, Bold Toronto: Kids Can Press, 1995.

References

20th-century Canadian photographers
20th-century Canadian women artists
21st-century Canadian women artists
21st-century Canadian photographers
Living people
1940 births
Artists from Erie, Pennsylvania
Photographers from Pennsylvania
American emigrants to Canada
American women photographers